Waikohu is a small settlement in the northeast of New Zealand's North Island. It is located close to the confluence of the Wharekopae and Waikohu Rivers on State Highway 2 to the west of Te Karaka, inland from Gisborne.

Populated places in the Gisborne District